Seyyed Nasereddin Rural District is a rural district (dehestan) in Zarrinabad District, Dehloran County, Ilam Province, Iran. At the 2006 census, its population was 2,242, in 432 families.  The rural district has 14 villages.

References 

Rural Districts of Ilam Province
Dehloran County